Alex Binnie may refer to:
 Alexander Binnie (1839–1917), British civil engineer
 Alex Binnie (footballer)
 Alex Binnie (tattoo artist)